"Hurt Me Bad (In a Real Good Way)" is a song written by Deborah Allen and Rafe Van Hoy, and recorded by American country music artist Patty Loveless.  It was released in September 1991 as the first single from her album Up Against My Heart.

Background
According to Loveless: "Hurt Me Bad ... actually Tony Brown was playing some stuff for me when we were looking for some songs for the fifth album for MCA. He played this one and he was telling me about Deborah Allen being a writer on it and her husband. We listened to it and it just hit me! The melody and just everything about it. I just loved the way she did the demo on it and just loved the way she sung the song. Even the idea of the song ... here's this person that's been hurt by one relationship... and now that this guy's out of her life .. she's found a better relationship! So I just fell in love with it! It was a lot of fun to do the video because of the fact that John Jorgenson made it a lot of fun, and John Millen, the director, made it a lot of fun to do too. We did it in New Orleans... spent three days there... just had a big ole' time shooting it there in the French Quarter"

The song charted for 20 weeks on the Billboard Hot Country Singles and Tracks chart, reaching #3 during the week of November 23, 1991.

Chart positions

Year-end charts

References

1991 singles
Patty Loveless songs
Song recordings produced by Tony Brown (record producer)
Country ballads
Songs written by Deborah Allen
Song recordings produced by Emory Gordy Jr.
MCA Nashville Records singles
Music videos directed by John Lloyd Miller
Songs written by Rafe Van Hoy
1991 songs